Christofer Drew Ingle (born Christopher Drew Ingle; February 11, 1991) is an American musician best known as the frontman and guitarist of former bands indie rock Never Shout Never, and experimental metal band Eat Me Raw. In 2019, he became a father to son Lion Ezra Drew Ingle.

Early life 
Ingle was born in Oceanside, California to Nancy Keifner and Edward Ingle. He is of English, Irish, and German descent. He was raised in Joplin, Missouri.

Music career

Never Shout Never (2007–present)

Originally a solo project, Ingle began making music under the alias NeverShoutNever! in 2007 (age 16). His first exposure came through the internet, where he achieved success on MySpace before issuing the extended play, The Yippee EP on July 29, 2008. On July 30, 2008, he was featured on TRL, where he performed his single "Bigcitydreams." He toured with Hellogoodbye and Ace Enders in the fall of 2008. The spelling was later changed to 'Never Shout Never', and went on to form into a full band instead of a solo project exclusive to Ingle. Ingle revealed in December 2018 that after a small tour in Mexico and Brasil the following month, Never Shout Never would disband. However, he reached out to fans via an Instagram post two days later asking if he should keep making music under the name. Following the final show in Brasil he stated he was uncertain of the band's future. Ingle went on to release Unborn Spark, an acoustic LP, on June 12, 2020, after a 5-year break from releasing new music.

Eatmewhileimhot! (2008–2019)

In 2008 Ingle and fellow band members of Never Shout Never, Taylor McFee, Hayden Kaiser, and former member Caleb Denison, created an experimental band by the name "Eatmewhileimhot!", originally making music with post-hardcore influences, and on later releases experimenting by expanding their sound into metalcore, deathcore, and experimental metal.

Other projects (2011−present)
In 2011, Ingle released his debut solo EP called The Modern Racket. He released a free solo EP in 2012 titled, The Light. He started a side project called Gonzo in 2012 and released three EPs, Beet Pharm, Da Funq and Esoteric. In 2020, Ingle started a new psychedelic project called Dryymy.

In 2022, Ingle revealed on Twitter that he would begin a new screamo project named "Shogun" and that he would be working on an EP for the project. On March 8, 2022, Ingle announced on Twitter that he would be retiring from music and decided to not release "Shogun." However, he announced a new single for Shogun in August 2022. Ingle also started an EDM project called Shen Chow.

Personal life
At the age of 16, Christofer became a vegetarian. Ingle is also Christian. In 2019 at the age of 28, Christofer became a father to son, Lion Ezra Drew Ingle with former partner Analicia Safire.

In 2012, Ingle was arrested for marijuana possession and was charged two felonies.

Discography
Never Shout Never

What Is Love? (Sire, 2010)
Harmony (Sire, 2010)
Time Travel (Sire, 2011)
Indigo (Sire, 2012)
Sunflower (Sire, 2013)
Recycled Youth Vol. 1 (Sire, 2015)
Black Cat (Sire, 2015)
Unborn Spark (Kymica, 2020)

SoloThe Modern Racket (EP) (Loveway, 2011)The Light (EP) (Loveway, 2012)

Eatmewhileimhot!xALBUMx (Loveway, 2010)Mushroom (Loveway, 2012)

The GonzoBeet Pharm (Loveway, 2012)DaFunQ (Loveway, 2013)

Shen ChowThis Is (EP)'' (2022)

References

1991 births
Living people
21st-century American singers
Alternative rock guitarists
Alternative rock singers
American indie rock musicians
American rock guitarists
American male guitarists
American rock singers
Singers from Missouri
People from Joplin, Missouri
21st-century American guitarists
Guitarists from Missouri
21st-century American male singers